Ilias Selionis (born 29 December 1959), is a Greek former professional football player who played as a defender.

Club career
Selionis started his career from Kissavos Sykourion before he joined the youth section of AE Larissa in 1974 under Argentinian coach Horacio Moráles. He debuted for AEL's first team on 6 March 1976 against FAS Naoussa in the Greek second division.  He moved to OFI in 1981 where he remained until 1984 and subsequently signed for AO Trikala. Selionis then played for Toxotis Larissa in Delta Ethniki and other local Larissa FCA clubs with Omonoia being his last in the early 1990s.He overall played in Greek first division for 6 years (1978-1984).

International career
Selionis played for Greece U-19 and Greece U-21 a total 15 times in the late 1970s. He was also called up by coach Kostas Polychroniou to feature in the qualification stages of the 1978 UEFA Amateur Cup, alongside Takis Persias, Kostas Maloumidis and others.

Coaching career
After his retirement he coached various local clubs such as Haravgi and later he became the longest serving arch-coach and also secretary of the Larissa FCA. In 2013 he took the role of the team manager and youth scout for AEL remaining at his post until 2017.

Honors
Greek second division: 1978
Larissa FCA Cup: 1975

References

1959 births
Greek footballers
Athlitiki Enosi Larissa F.C. players
Living people
Association football defenders
Footballers from Larissa